Ramakant Krishnaji Deshpande is an Indian surgical oncologist, known as the pioneer of thoracoscopic surgery at the Tata Memorial Hospital. The Government of India honoured him, in 2014, with the award of Padma Shri, the fourth highest civilian award, for his contributions to the fields of medicine.

Biography
Ramakant Deshpande graduated in medicine (MBBS) from Karnataka Medical College, Hubli and did his post graduate studies (MS) at the Tata Memorial Hospital, Mumbai. This was followed by a higher training stint at the Memorial Sloan Kettering Cancer Center, New York. He also holds higher degrees such as FICS, Fellowship in Anterior Segment (FIAS), DHA and FAIS.

Deshpande's career started at the Kidwai Memorial Institute of Oncology in 1982. Three years later, in 1985, he returned to his alma mater, Tata Memorial Hospital, and worked there till 2002, as the Chief of Thoracic Services. His current position is as the Head of Surgical Oncology at the S. L. Raheja Hospital, which was taken over by the Fortis Healthcare in 2009, and presently known as Asian Institute of Oncology where he is the executive vice chairman. He has also been a consultant oncologist at Lilavati Hospital, Mumbai.

Deshpande is also associated with other establishments. He is the Director of firms such as Karnataka Leasing And Commercial Corporation Limited Director, Triumph Estates Private Limited,
Triumph Hospitals Private Limited, Asian Institute Of Oncology Private Limited and Asian Cancer Foundation. His wife, Geethanjali also serves as the Director of Triumph Hospitals Private Limited.

Deshpande is credited with over 50 publications, both books and articles published in national and international journals. He has also written chapters in a book, Textbook of Cancer, published by the National Book Trust.

Awards and honours
Game Changers Award by The HR Club on 7 February 2015.

References

Further reading
 
 
 

Living people
Recipients of the Padma Shri in medicine
Indian oncologists
Indian medical writers
People from Hubli
20th-century Indian medical doctors
Medical doctors from Karnataka
Year of birth missing (living people)